Zarach (also Romanized as Zārch; also known as Zarej and Zārj) is a city in, and the capital of Zarach District of Yazd County, Yazd province, Iran. At the 2006 census, its population was 9,979 in 2,447 households. The following census in 2011 counted 10,753 people in 2,858 households. The latest census in 2016 showed a population of 11,691 people in 3,388 households.

Zarach is situated 5 km west of the city of Yazd. This city has the longest and oldest kariz in the world, with a length of 71 km and is over 3,000 years of age.

References 

Yazd County

Cities in Yazd Province

Populated places in Yazd Province

Populated places in Yazd County